China is a mountainous country, which leads to rapid dissipation of cyclones that move inland as well as significant amounts of rain from those dissipating cyclones.  Typhoon Nina in 1975 caused the collapse of two huge reservoirs and ten smaller dams when 1062 mm (41.81 inches) of rain fell in Henan Province during a 24‑hour period.  Super Typhoon Carla was the wettest tropical cyclone on record for mainland China. Since 1957, there has been a downward trend in tropical cyclone rainfall for the country.

Mainland
Most of the rain China experiences during the year occurs during the summer months.  Typhoons cause many of the intense rains seen within the country.  The heavy rains occur over a large area, typically . Across China between the years of 1983 and 2006, an average of 2.9 tropical cyclones move into Guangdong province, making it the most affected province within mainland China.  Hainan averages 1.3 tropical cyclones annually, while Fujian experiences 1.2 tropical cyclones annually, and Zhejiang witnessed 0.9 tropical cyclones annually.  The wettest tropical cyclone on record for the mainland was Super Typhoon Carla, which dropped  of rain over a 48-hour period.  Typhoon Nina (1975) produced the highest areal average rainfall amounts between August 4 and August 8 for the Hongru river basin for most time durations.  The risk of tropical cyclones across Guangxi, Jiangsu, Shandong, and Liaoning provinces is significantly lower, with these provinces averaging between 0.1 and 0.4 tropical cyclones annually.

Hong Kong
Typhoon Sam of the 1999 Pacific typhoon season became the wettest known tropical cyclone to impact Hong Kong since records began in 1884, breaking a 73‑year‑old record.  A total of 23.98 inches/609 mm of rainfall fell between August 22 and August 25.

Lantau Island

Taiwan/Taipei
The mountainous island of Taiwan province experiences an average of 1.8 tropical cyclone landfalls each year.  Due to its rugged topography, Taiwan sees extreme rains from tropical cyclones, particularly in its central mountain range.

Tibet Autonomous Region
An early October 2004 tropical depression brought moisture into the highlands of Tibet, leading to daily precipitation of 60 mm/2.4 inches liquid equivalent to Che-Ku County all in the form of heavy snow, which was a new October daily precipitation record for both rain and snow.  This led to a loss of 340,000 kg of food, 230,000 kg of forage grass, and 263 livestock in the snowstorm.

See also
List of wettest tropical cyclones
List of wettest tropical cyclones by country
Tropical cyclone
Tropical cyclone rainfall climatology
Tropical cyclone rainfall forecasting

References

Tropical cyclone meteorology